A dress form is a three-dimensional model of the torso used for fitting clothing that is being designed or sewed.  When making a piece of clothing, it can be put on the dress form so one can see the fit and drape of the garment as it would appear on a body, and make adjustments or alterations. Dress forms come in all sizes and shapes for almost every article of clothing that can be made.  Dress forms in the standard clothing sizes are used to make patterns, while adjustable dress forms allow garments to be tailored to fit a specific individual.

This is often colloquially referred to as a Judy for the female form and a James for the male.

Structure

Preparatory Structure -  Mold Creation 
Before making the dress forms, exact measurement and natural shape built prototype are the keys to creating two side fiber molds. The prototype can be built by either traditional handmade or modern digital version from 3D software. After the prototype, the dress forms should make precisely the same as the prototype with functions for fitting purposes.

First Structure - Internal Treatment 
To create the fiberglass base as the first step, putting entirely thick fiberglass, filling up in both side molds, and using resin to stick both sides for few hours until dry is the emphasis to prevent deforming in the very beginning. Then, dismantling both molds to polish surplus fiberglass in each edge until the whole body smooth to remain the exact measurements and further treatment.

Second Structure - Accessories 
In order to assemble and install accessories on the fiberglass base, the board for fixing position and slingshot for arm/hip joint collapsible movement need to place inside the fiberglass base. The Load-bearing steel bar from the dress forms top to around waist which is for hanging purpose also need to place before surface treatment.

Last Structure - Surface Treatment 
The surface of the dress forms has to be as close as possible to make the shape tight. The first layer is needle wool, which uses glue to stick on the fiberglass, then wraps needle wool around the whole body to make the dress form pinnable. The second layer is linen after the cloth cropping, sewing, and wrapping process that makes the surface smooth and more durable during the garment wearing. Lastly, putting measurement line and surface joint accessories to complete the dress forms.

See also
 Mannequin

References

External links
 
 The Structure Of Dress Form, an article describes the dress forms structure.

Sewing equipment